The Rivers State Road Traffic Management Authority (abbreviated TIMA-RIV) is a government corporation that handles matters relating to road safety, traffic management and transportation in Rivers State. It was set up under the Road Traffic Law No.6 of 2009. Its headquarters are in Port Harcourt. The corporation has an affiliation with the State Ministry of Transport. The Comptroller General heading its operations is appointed by the Governor.

Functions
The Road Traffic Law 2009 empowers the Corporation to carry out amongst other functions the duties to:

Control of traffic and enforce state laws relating to the safe use of vehicles on the road.
Deter road users from the commission of road traffic offences and apprehend road traffic offenders.
Conduct highly visible day and night traffic patrols to enforce traffic rules and regulations and clear highway of obstruction.
Enforce the use of bus stops and bus terminals.

See also
List of government agencies of Rivers State

References

External links

Government agencies and parastatals of Rivers State
Government agencies established in 2009
2000s establishments in Rivers State
Transport authorities in Nigeria
Law enforcement in Rivers State
2009 establishments in Nigeria
Transportation in Rivers State
Old GRA, Port Harcourt
Traffic management
Road authorities